Uncial 0211 (in the Gregory-Aland numbering), ε 051 (Soden), is a Greek uncial manuscript of the New Testament, dated paleographically to the 7th century.

Description 

The codex contains a complete text of the four Gospels, on 258 parchment leaves (27 cm by 19.5 cm). Written in two columns per page, 8 lines per page, in uncial letters.

The text-type of this codex is a representative of the Byzantine text-type. Hermann von Soden classified it to the K1. Aland placed it in Category V.

According to the Claremont Profile Method it represents the textual family Kx in Luke 1, in Luke 10 it has a mixture of the Byzantine families, in Luke 20 it has mixed text. In Luke 1 it belongs to the textual cluster 1213; it is related to the Codex Campianus in Luke 10 and Luke 20.

Currently it is dated by the INTF to the 7th century.

The manuscript was added to the list of the New Testament manuscripts by Kurt Aland in 1953.

The codex is currently housed at the Georgian National Center of Manuscripts (Gr. 27) in Tbilisi, Georgia (not to be confused with the American state).

See also 

 List of New Testament uncials
 Textual criticism

References

Further reading

External links 

 Wieland Willker, Uncial 0211 "Textual Commentary"
 Online images of Uncial 0211 at the CSNTM.

Greek New Testament uncials
7th-century biblical manuscripts